The House of Assembly of Eswatini is the lower chamber of the country's bicameral Parliament. The Assembly may debate and pass bills.

History
The House of Assembly was established in 1967 when the Legislative Council was disbanded and bicameral legislature was established in the new constitution.

Constitution
A maximum of 76 members are permitted by section 95 (1) of the Constitution. There are currently 66. Fifty-five members are elected from single-member constituencies corresponding to the tinkhundlas (tribal communities). Fourteen tinkhundlas are in Hhohho District, 11 in Lubombo District, 16 in Manzini District, and 14 in Shiselweni District. The King appoints the other ten members, at least half of whom must be women. The 66th member is the Speaker of the House, who is elected from outside the House. If the percentage of women members falls below 30%, a maximum of four women may be elected from the administrative regions.

Each member must be a citizen of Eswatini, at least 18 years old, a registered voter, and have "paid all taxes or made arrangements satisfactory to the Commissioner of Taxes".

The House selects ten of the 30 members of the upper chamber, the Senate of Eswatini, the King appointing the rest.

Elections
Candidates are first nominated at the tinkhundla level. The top three finishers by secret ballot then proceed to a general election, also by secret ballot, in a first-past-the-post system of voting, where the candidate who receives the most votes is elected. All candidates run on a non-partisan basis, as political parties are banned in the country, and serve five-year terms.

Observer teams from the Commonwealth of Nations were present at the 2003, 2008 and 2013 elections. The most recent election took place in September 2018.

See also
 History of Eswatini
 List of national legislatures
 List of speakers of the House of Assembly of Eswatini
 Legislative branch

References

Eswatini
Government of Eswatini
1967 establishments in Swaziland